San Pascual may refer to:

 Paschal Baylon, a Spanish friar and saint in the Roman Catholic Church
 San Pascual, Batangas in the Philippines
 San Pascual, Masbate in the Philippines
 San Pascual, Ávila in Castile and León, Spain
 San Pascual (Madrid), a ward of Ciudad Lineal district, Madrid, Spain
 San Pascualito, a folk saint venerated in Guatemala and southern Mexico

See also
 San Pasqual (disambiguation)